Mary Dilys Glynne  (19 February 1895 – 9 May 1991) was a British plant pathologist and mountaineer.

She was the first plant pathologist at Rothamsted Experimental Station and was particularly interested in soil-based fungal diseases including potato wart, eyespot in wheat and take-all. She discovered a method for identifying varieties of crop resistant to these fungal diseases and proved that methods such as crop rotation only perpetuated the problem. Her research led to increased yields in agriculture, which was of particular note during World War II, and was appointed an OBE for her services to agriculture.

Glynne was also a passionate mountaineer, climbing a number of famous Alpine peaks. She was the second person, the first woman, to climb Mount Spencer in New Zealand.

Early life
Glynne was born Mary Dilys Glynne Jones in Upper Bangor, Gwynedd in North Wales on 19 February 1895. Her father, John Glynne Jones, was a solicitor and her mother, Dilys Lloyd Glynne Jones was secretary (and later Vice-President) of the Association for Promoting the Education of Girls in Wales. The couple had a total of five children. Glynne, as the middle child, had both an older and younger brother and sister. Glynne's mother was one of the founders of the Bangor School for Girls, so Glynne was educated there before attending North London Collegiate School, another school with links to her mother. Her degree in botany was attained from University College of North Wales in 1917 and soon after she dropped the "Jones" from her name.

Plant pathology
As soon as Glynne graduated she was offered a post in the University College of North Wales department of agriculture, but within a few months she was volunteering at Rothamsted Experimental Station where E. John Russell was director. Winifred Brenchley, the first woman to work in agricultural sciences, soon offered her a permanent assistant botanist position at Rothamsted, where she remained for 43 years. Glynne was one of the original members of the Mycology Department in 1918 and later founded the Plant Pathology Department. Glynne's first major work was studying Synchytrium endobioticum, the cause of potato wart disease. A modified version of her method for identifying varieties resistant to the disease, the Glynne-Lemmerzahl method, is still in use today. The work was sufficiently notable that the University of Wales awarded Glynne an MSc in 1922 for her achievements.

Glynne was the British winner of the Dr. Georgina Sweet fellowship in 1927, awarded at the Vienna conference of International Federation of University Women. The award included a year's study in Australia, Tasmania and New Zealand, which she undertook in 1928 after spending time with Dr. Sweet. Whilst there, she worked at the University of Melbourne and toured the country with the Department of Agriculture to promote better farming techniques. As part of her return journey, she visited a number of African countries, learning about the agricultural difficulties they faced. Whilst in South Africa, she attended the 1929 meeting of the British Association.

By the 1930s, Glynne's focus was on cereal diseases, especially soil-borne varieties. She was able to prove that the lodging or flattening of wheat close to harvest was frequently not the result of wind or rain, but instead caused by take-all and eyespot, both soil-borne fungal diseases. Glynne was able to not only identify the fungal cause and which strains of cereal were less susceptible, but also establish that crop rotation exacerbated the issue. On this basis, she was able to advise which strains of cereal should be planted in the affected fields. Glynne also discovered Gibellina cerealis in 1935, a fungal pathogen thought to be introduced to the UK by Roman settlers.

Glynne's work on crop diseases was subject to significant attention towards the end of World War II, as maximising the production of food was essential due to shortages. Her work, especially on eyespot in wheat, afforded her a DSc from University of Wales in 1943. In both the 1940s and 1950s, she carried on her pioneering work in cereal pathology and made "unexpected" discoveries related to the disposal of organic material in the soil.

Other interests
One of Glynne's main interests was mountaineering and rock climbing, although her family did not support the hobby, as her mother's cousin, Owen Glynne Jones died at the age of 32 in a climbing accident on Dent Blanche. Despite this, Glynne climbed throughout her life, including in Australia and New Zealand whilst she was touring there. She recorded the second ever ascent of Mount Spencer in New Zealand, the first by a woman. When she returned to Europe, she climbed major Alpine peaks such as Matterhorn, Mont Blanc, La Meije and Aiguille du Dru in the 1930s. She carried on climbing into her 60s, ascending Mount Fuji in Japan in 1963.

Glynne gave a series of lectures to the Royal Geographic society on Angkor Wat and other parts of Cambodia during the 1950s and 1960s. She was recognised by the Cambodia tourist board in their printed guides to the site.

Legacy and death
Glynne was made a fellow of the Institute of Biology and in the 1960 Birthday Honours, she was appointed Officer of the Most Excellent Order of the British Empire (OBE) for her services to agriculture, and retired that same year. Instead of giving up work completely she moved to a volunteer role at Rothamsted for two more years. In mountaineering, Glynne was a member of the Fell & Rock Climbing Club, the Pinnacle Club and Vice-President of the Ladies' Alpine Club. In 1991, at the age of 96, Glynne developed bronchopneumonia and died in her nursing home in Harpenden.

Bibliography

Notes

References

1895 births
1991 deaths
19th-century Welsh people
19th-century Welsh women
20th-century British botanists
20th-century British women scientists
20th-century Welsh scientists
20th-century Welsh writers
20th-century Welsh women writers
British phytopathologists
Women phytopathologists
Rothamsted Experimental Station people
Welsh mountain climbers
Alumni of Bangor University
Welsh non-fiction writers
People from Bangor, Gwynedd
Officers of the Order of the British Empire
Female climbers
Deaths from pneumonia in England
Deaths from bronchopneumonia
20th-century agronomists